The Roman Theatre is an ancient Roman theatre in Cartagena, Spain.

History

The theatre was built between 5 and 1 BCE, as has been proven by the dedication of the edifice to Gaius and Lucius Caesar, grandsons of Augustus, who had designated them as his successors.

In the 3rd century a market was built over the theatre, reusing its materials, with a semicircular open space which followed the plan of the orchestra. The market was perhaps abandoned after a fire caused by the Vandals in 425. A market quarter of the Byzantines was established on the site in the 6th century.

During the 13th century the Old Cathedral of the city was built over the upper cavea. In 1988 the first remains of the theatre were discovered during the construction of the  Centro regional de artesanía. The archaeological excavations and the restorations were completed in 2003. In 2008 a museum, designed by  Rafael Moneo, was opened.

Description

The cavea was carved directly on the rocks in its central part, and tops a series of vaulted galleries. It had a capacity of some 6,000 spectators. It was divided horizontally in three parts (ima, media and summa cavea), in turn divided into radial sectors by the staircases (five in the upper part, seven in the medium and upper ones).

The public entered from two side passages  (aditus), where the dedications have been found. The orchestra had a semicircular plan and housed three  rows of wooden seats for the authorities  (proedria). The stage  (proscaenium) had a length of   43.60 m. The  scaenae frons had three semicircular exedras and decorated by two orders of columns, with bases and capitals in Luni's marble, and shaft in pink travertine of Mula. The stage edifice had a total height of 14.60 m. It have been found three round altars dedicated to the Capituline Triad and to the divinities of Apollo (Graces, Muses and Horae), as well as a statue of Apollo with lyre and one of Rhea Silvia.

Behind the stage building was  a portico (porticus post scaenam) with a double porticoed gallery revolving around a central room housing a garden.

See also
 List of Roman theatres

External links
Page at archinfo.it 
Official page 

1 BC
1988 archaeological discoveries
Ancient Roman theatres in Spain
Buildings and structures completed in the 1st century BC
Buildings and structures in Cartagena, Spain
Tourist attractions in the Region of Murcia